Joanna Cassidy (born Joanna Virginia Caskey, August 2, 1945) is an American actress. She is known for her roles as the replicant Zhora Salome in Blade Runner (1982) and Dolores in Who Framed Roger Rabbit (1988). She has won a Golden Globe Award, was nominated for three Emmy Awards and also was nominated for a Saturn Award and Screen Actors Guild Awards.

Cassidy also has starred in films such as Under Fire (1983), The Fourth Protocol (1987), The Package (1989), Where the Heart Is (1990), Don't Tell Mom the Babysitter's Dead (1991), Vampire in Brooklyn (1995), and Ghosts of Mars (2001). From 2001 to 2005, she played Margaret Chenowith on the HBO drama series Six Feet Under for which she received Primetime Emmy Award and Screen Actors Guild Award nominations. From 2011 to 2013, she played Joan Hunt on the ABC series Body of Proof, and from 2010 to 2013 starred in the HBO Canada comedy series Call Me Fitz for which she won two Canadian Screen Awards.

Early life and education
Cassidy was born Joanna Virginia Caskey in Camden, New Jersey, the daughter of Virginia and Joe Caskey. She was raised in Haddonfield, and attended Haddonfield Memorial High School, and has described herself as being "a rowdy kid" there. She is known for her infectious, howling laugh which can be heard in the film The Laughing Policeman and on her appearances on The Tonight Show Starring Johnny Carson.

Cassidy majored in art at Syracuse University. During her time there, she married Kennard C. Kobrin in 1964, a doctor in residency, and found work as a fashion model. They moved to San Francisco, where her husband set up a psychiatric practice while Cassidy continued modeling. They had a son and a daughter together. In 1968, she landed a bit part in Bullitt.

Career

Cassidy's first film appearance was in The Outfit (1973). She appeared in a 1973 Smokey Bear public service announcement (PSA), and on such television series as Mission: Impossible, Starsky & Hutch and Taxi. She had a small role in Stay Hungry (1976), a film about bodybuilding that featured a young Arnold Schwarzenegger. Cassidy was considered for the role of Wonder Woman for a television series, but lost it to Lynda Carter. She co-starred in the film Our Winning Season (1978). Her first regular role was as sheriff's pilot Morgan Wainwright in the action-adventure series 240-Robert (1979), although the series only lasted for two abbreviated seasons. Afterwards, Cassidy continued to appear in guest roles in series such as Dallas and Falcon Crest, as well as a regular role on the short-lived sitcom Buffalo Bill (1983) (for which she earned a Golden Globe Award). She starred on the short-lived NBC television series Code Name: Foxfire (1985).

In 1982, Cassidy had her first major feature film role as the replicant snake performer Zhora Salome in Ridley Scott's Blade Runner. The following year, she co-starred in Under Fire with Gene Hackman and Nick Nolte. She continued to appear in both films and television; she co-starred in the television miniseries Hollywood Wives (1985), and appeared in The Fourth Protocol (1987), Who Framed Roger Rabbit (1988), 1969, The Package (1989), Where the Heart Is (1990) and Don't Tell Mom the Babysitter's Dead (1991). In 1993, she co-starred with Dudley Moore on the sitcom Dudley, but the series only lasted for six episodes. She played the ex-wife of James Garner's lead character in the television movie, The Rockford Files: I Still Love L.A. (1994).

Her other screen credits from this era include Barbarians at the Gate (1993), the miniseries adaptation of Stephen King's The Tommyknockers (1993), and Wes Craven's Vampire in Brooklyn (1995). Cassidy also provided the voice of Inspector Maggie Sawyer on The WB series Superman: The Animated Series, and had recurring guest roles on television series such as L.A. Law, Melrose Place, Diagnosis: Murder, and The District.

Since 2000, Cassidy has appeared in the film Ghosts of Mars (2001) directed by John Carpenter, and had a recurring role as Margaret Chenowith on the HBO drama series Six Feet Under, for which she received Emmy Award and Screen Actors Guild Award nominations. In 2004, she guest-starred in three episodes of Star Trek: Enterprise as T'Les (the Vulcan mother of Enterprise crewmember T'Pol), and she had a recurring role as Beverly Bridge on the series Boston Legal in 2006. She voiced the villainess Hecubah in the computer game Nox (2000) and once again voiced the character of Maggie Sawyer in the 2002 video game Superman: Shadow of Apokolips.

In the spring of 2007, Cassidy donned Zhora's costume once more, 25 years after the release of Blade Runner, to recreate a climactic scene from the film for the fall 2007 Final Cut release of the film. In the original 1982 release, a stunt performer played out Zhora's death scene, with the physical differences between the performer and Cassidy very evident (including the stuntwoman wearing a different wig). For the Final Cut, Cassidy's head was digitally transposed onto footage of the stunt performer, making the death scene fit continuity. According to the DVD featurette, All Our Variant Futures, it was Cassidy herself who suggested this be done; she is captured on video making the suggestion during filming of a retrospective interview related to Blade Runner.

In the second season of the NBC series Heroes, she is seen in a photo of the 12 senior members of the show's mysterious company. Beyond appearances in photographs, the actress first appeared as Victoria Pratt in the 10th episode of season two, "Truth & Consequences", during which her character was killed.

In 2008–2009, Cassidy appeared in episodes of Ghost Whisperer, Desperate Housewives, Law & Order: UK, and was also seen in the recurring guest role of Amanda Hawthorne, the mother-in-law of Jada Pinkett Smith's eponymous character on the medical drama Hawthorne.

In 2011, Cassidy began to appear in a recurring role on the ABC series Body of Proof as Judge Joan Hunt, the mother of Megan Hunt, Dana Delany's character on the series. The series was canceled by ABC after three seasons in May 2013. In 2015, Cassidy was cast as a main character in the Bravo scripted series Odd Mom Out. She plays the role of Candace Von Weber, a snobbish Upper East Side socialite and mother-in-law to the show's protagonist Jill Weber (Jill Kargman). The series was canceled in 2017. In 2019, she co-starred in the Amazon Prime miniseries Too Old to Die Young and later had a recurring role on NCIS: New Orleans.

In 2015, Cassidy received an honorary award at the Oldenburg International Film Festival.

Filmography

Film

Television

References

External links

 
 
 Joanna Cassidy at the American Film Institute Catalog
 

1944 births
Living people
Actresses from New Jersey
American film actresses
American television actresses
American video game actresses
Best Musical or Comedy Actress Golden Globe (television) winners
Haddonfield Memorial High School alumni
People from Camden, New Jersey
People from Haddonfield, New Jersey
20th-century American actresses
21st-century American actresses
Syracuse University College of Visual and Performing Arts alumni
Female models from New Jersey
Best Actress in a Comedy Series Canadian Screen Award winners
Best Supporting Actress in a Comedy Series Canadian Screen Award winners